{{DISPLAYTITLE:C19H40}}
The molecular formula C19H40 (molar mass: 268.51 g/mol, exact mass: 268.3130 u) may refer to:

 Nonadecane, an alkane hydrocarbon with the chemical formula CH3(CH2)17CH3
 Pristane, a natural saturated terpenoid alkane

Molecular formulas